Azadi (Urdu:آزادی, literal English translation: "freedom") is the fourth studio album and the fifth overall album of the Pakistani sufi rock band, Junoon. The album was released in 1997 and established the Sufi rock sound that the band pioneered on their previous album, Inquilaab. The album was popular worldwide, bringing fame to Junoon.

Music videos were released for the two singles from the album, "Sayonee" and "Yaar Bina". "Sayonee" is Junoon's biggest hit to date, topping all charts in South Asia and also gaining significant airplay on satellite channels across the Middle East. The album sold 1million units in India alone.

Background
Azadi was released by Junoon in 1997 and was the band's debut album in India. The album's first single, "Sayonee", became an instant hit in South Asia and the Middle East, shooting to the top of all the Asian charts, and staying at #1 on both Channel V and MTV Asia for over 2 months. Azadi hit platinum sales status in a record of 4 weeks. Zee TV invited Junoon to perform at the star-studded Zee Cine Awards in Mumbai in March 1998, where the group received accolades from the creme de la creme of India's entertainment industry.

In 1998, Junoon won the "Best International Group" title at the Channel V Music Awards, where they performed along with worldwide icons Sting, The Prodigy and Def Leppard. Azadi was nominated for Best International Album, having achieved the prestigious honour of being the highest selling album in Pakistan and Bangladesh 1998 and 1999. Junoon headlined the BBC Mega Mela in 1998, which was the largest Asian festival outside of the South Asia. The album made the band famous throughout the world.

Track listing
All music written & composed by Salman Ahmad and Sabir Zafar. Except for "Khudi" which was written by Allama Iqbal.

Personnel
All information is taken from the CD.

Junoon
 Ali Azmat - vocals 
 Salman Ahmad- lead guitar, backing vocals
Brian O'Connell - bass guitar, backing vocals

Additional musicians
Ustad Aashiq Ali: Tambourin, Tabla

Production
Produced by John Alec & Salman Ahmad
Engineered & Mixed by John Alec

References

External links
 Junoon's Official Website

1997 albums
Junoon (band) albums